In the Egyptian League 2003/2004, fourteen teams has participated. The first placed team in the league is the league's champion and qualifies, along  with the second placed, team to CAF Champions League 2005. The third placed team qualifies to CAF Champions League 2005. The teams with the last three places in the league will be relegated to the Egyptian Second Division.

Each team plays 26 matches from August 2003 to July 2004.

Teams

 Al Ahly
 Tersana
 Zamalek
 Ghazl Al-Mehalla
 ENPPI
 Ismaili
 El-Ittihad El-Iskandary
 El-Masry
 El Mansoura
 Baladeyet El-Mahalla
 Aswan
 Olympic El Qanal
 Koroum
 Haras El Hodood

League table

0
2003–04 in African association football leagues
Premier